Magali Sauri (born 26 September 1977) is a French former ice dancer. With Nicolas Salicis, she placed fifth at the 1997 World Junior Championships. After their partnership ended, she competed for two seasons with Olivier Chapuis. In 1999, Sauri teamed up with Russia's Michail Stifunin. Representing France, they skated together for three seasons and won the silver medal at the 2000 Nebelhorn Trophy. Sauri/Stifunin were coached by Lydie Bontemps in Lyon.

Programs 
(with Stifunin)

Results 
GP: Grand Prix

With Stifunin

With Chapuis

With Salicis

References 

French female ice dancers
Living people
1977 births
Sportspeople from Montpellier
20th-century French women